A Retrospective is a compilation album by American rock band Lynyrd Skynyrd.

Reception 
The AllMusic review by Thom Jurek awarded the album three stars, stating: "As single-disc budget compilations go, this is a solid one so far as it goes. It contains most of the band's biggest hits and only contains two notorious omissions, since 'Tuesday's Gone,' and 'That Smell' aren't here. Other than that, it's got what most casual listeners need of their biggest songs: 'Sweet Home Alabama,' the nine-minute studio version of 'Free Bird,' 'Saturday Night Special,' 'You've Got That Right,' 'Gimme Three Steps,' and 'What's Your Name?' Of course there have been better comps issued since 1999, but this is OK, and a cheap stopgap."

Track listing 

"Sweet Home Alabama" (Ed King, Gary Rossington, Ronnie Van Zant) – 4:45
"Free Bird" (Allen Collins, Van Zant) – 9:10
"Saturday Night Special" (King, Van Zant) – 5:09
"Double Trouble" (Collins, Van Zant) – 2:50
"What's Your Name?" (Rossington, Van Zant) – 3:33
"You Got That Right" (Steve Gaines, Van Zant) – 3:47
"Am I Losin'?" (Rossington, Van Zant) – 4:34
"Gimme Three Steps" (Collins, Van Zant) – 4:30
"Don't Ask Me No Questions" (Rossington, Van Zant) – 3:26
"Made in the Shade" (Van Zant) – 4:39
"All I Can Do Is Write About It" (Collins, Van Zant) – 4:19
"I Know a Little" (Gaines) – 3:27
"Mr. Banker" (King, Rossington, Van Zant) – 5:19
"Truck Drivin' Man" (King, Van Zant) – 5:17
Tracks 1 and 9 from Second Helping (1974)
Tracks 2 and 8 from (Pronounced 'Lĕh-'nérd 'Skin-'nérd) (1973)
Tracks 3, 7, and 10 from Nuthin' Fancy (1975)
Tracks 4 and 11 from Gimme Back My Bullets (1976)
Tracks 5–6 and 12 from Street Survivors (1977)
Tracks 13 and 14 from Legend (1987)

References 

1993 greatest hits albums
Lynyrd Skynyrd compilation albums